Herve Josse "Hervey" Robinson (1874 – 24 January 1954) was an English professional footballer who played as an inside forward.

References

1874 births
1954 deaths
Footballers from Grimsby
English footballers
Association football inside forwards
Grimsby All Saints F.C. players
Grimsby Town F.C. players
English Football League players